Gransito Movie Awards 2008 is the 8th edition of Gransito Movie Awards, the first Italian online film award.
The winners were announced 6 May 2008 on the official site.

Best movie
- American Gangster  (by Ridley Scott, Usa)
- Atonement  (by Joe Wright, Uk/Fra)
- Into the Wild  (by Sean Penn, Usa)
- Le vite degli altri  (di Florian Henckel von Donnersmarck, Ger)
- No Country for Old Men  (di Joel Coen & Ethan Coen, Usa)

Best director
- Paul Thomas Anderson (There Will Be Blood)
- Joel Coen & Ethan Coen (No Country for Old Men)
- Ermanno Olmi (Centochiodi)
- Sean Penn (Into the Wild)
- Ridley Scott (American Gangster)

Best actor in leading role
- George Clooney (Michael Clayton)
- Daniel Day-Lewis (There Will Be Blood)
- Emile Hirsch (Into the Wild)
- Viggo Mortensen (La promessa dell'assassino)
- Denzel Washington (American Gangster)

Best actress in leading role
- Cate Blanchett (Elizabeth - The Golden Age)
- Julie Christie (Lontano da lei)
- Marion Cotillard (La vie en rose)
- Keira Knightley (Espiazione)
- Meryl Streep (Leoni per agnelli)

Best original screenplay
- Caramel
- Centochiodi
- Io non sono qui
- La promessa dell'assassino
- Le vite degli altri
- Onora il padre e la madre
- Ratatouille

Best adapted screenplay
- Espiazione
- Into the Wild
- No Country for Old Men

Best Italian movie
- Caos calmo  (by Antonello Grimaldi)
- Centochiodi  (by Ermanno Olmi)
- Come l'ombra  (by Marina Spada)
- Giorni e nuvole  (by Silvio Soldini)
- Mio fratello è figlio unico  (by Daniele Luchetti)

Best actor in supporting role
- Casey Affleck (L'assassinio di Jesse James per mano del codardo Robert Ford)
- Javier Bardem (No Country for old men)
- Philip Seymour Hoffman (La guerra di Charlie Wilson)
- Heath Ledger (Io non sono qui)
- Tom Wilkinson (Michael Clayton)

Best actress in supporting role
- Cate Blanchett (Io non sono qui)
- Helena Bonham Carter (Sweeney Todd: il diabolico barbiere di Fleet Street)
- Hafsia Herzi (Cous cous)
- Tilda Swinton (Michael Clayton)
- Charlize Theron (Nella valle di Elah)

Best independent movie
- 4 mesi, 3 settimane, 2 giorni  (by Cristian Mungiu, Rom)
- Caramel  (by Nadine Labaki, Lib)
- Cous cous  (by Abdel Kechiche, Fra)
- Io non sono qui  (by Todd Haynes, Usa)
- Paranoid Park  (by Gus van Sant, Usa)

Best animated movie
- I Simpson - Il film  (by David Silverman, Fox, Usa)
- Persepolis  (by Marjane Satrapi & Vincent Paronnaud, 247 Films, Fra)
- Ratatouille  (by Brad Bird & Jan Pinkava, Walt Disney/Pixar, Usa)

Best cinematography
- American Gangster
- Espiazione
- Il petroliere
- Into the Wild
- L'assassinio di Jesse James per mano del codardo Robert Ford

Best make-up
- 300
- Elizabeth - The Golden Age
- La vie en rose
- Pirati dei Caraibi: ai confini del mondo
- Sweeney Todd: il diabolico barbiere di Fleet Street

Best costume design
- Elizabeth - The Golden Age
- Espiazione
- Hairspray
- La città proibita
- Sweeney Todd: il diabolico barbiere di Fleet Street

Best set decoration
- Across the Universe
- American Gangster
- Espiazione
- Il petroliere
- Sweeney Todd: il diabolico barbiere di Fleet Street

Best editing
- American Gangster
- Il petroliere
- Into the Wild
- No Country for Old Men
- The Bourne Ultimatum

Best soundtrack
- Across the Universe
- Espiazione
- Into the Wild
- Michael Clayton
- Ratatouille

Best visual effects
- Harry Potter e l'Ordine della Fenice
- La bussola d'oro
- Pirati dei Caraibi: ai confini del mondo

Best original song
- "Good morning Baltimore" (Hairspray)
- "Guaranteed" (Into the wild)
- "Tear down these houses" (Parlami d'amore) 

Best on-screen duo
- Cate Blanchett & Clive Owen (Elizabeth - The Golden Age)
- Johnny Depp & Helena Bonham Carter (Sweeney Todd)
- Tom Hanks & Julia Roberts (La guerra di Charlie Wilson)
- Remy & Linguini (Ratatouille)
- Denzel Washington & Russell Crowe (American Gangster)

Cult sequence
- "Danza del ventre" (Cous cous) 
- "Flashback sull'infanzia di Ego" (Ratatouille) 
- "Sequenza della sauna" (La promessa dell'assassino) 

Breakthrough female performance
- Amy Adams (actress; Come d'incanto)
- Katherine Heigl (actress; Molto incinta)
- Hafsia Herzi (actress; Cous cous)
- Anamaria Marinca (actress; 4 mesi 3 settimane 2 giorni)
- Marjane Satrapi (director and writer; Persepolis)

Breakthrough male performance
- Paul Dano (actor; Il petroliere)
- Elio Germano (actor; Mio fratello è figlio unico)
- Emile Hirsch (actor; Into the Wild)
- Shia LaBeouf (actor; Disturbia)
- Jim Sturgess (actor; Across the Universe)

Gransito Movie Awards
Gran